Antonio Zaccariello (born 28 March 1999) is an Italian professional footballer who plays as a midfielder for Desenzano Calvina.

Club career
In December 2018, Zaccariello joined to Fiorenzuola on loan. He renewed his contract on 26 August 2021. On 31 January 2022, the contract between Zaccariello and Fiorenzuola was terminated by mutual consent.

On 2 February 2022, Zaccariello signed with Serie D club Desenzano Calvina.

Notes

References

External links
 

1999 births
Living people
Italian footballers
Association football midfielders
Serie C players
Serie D players
A.C. Reggiana 1919 players
U.S. Fiorenzuola 1922 S.S. players